The vineyard style is a design of a concert hall where the seating surrounds the stage, rising up in serried rows in the manner of the sloping terraces of a vineyard. It may be contrasted with the shoebox style, which has a rectangular auditorium and a stage at one end (as at the Musikverein). Other possibilities are the fan-shaped (as at the Barbican) and the arena (as at the Royal Albert Hall). The design might be considered a musical theatre in the round.

History
When faced with designing a new home for the Berlin Philharmonic Orchestra to replace Die alte Philharmonie, destroyed by bombing in 1944, architect Hans Scharoun observed that "people always gather in circles when listening to music informally". His design won the ensuing competition, with Herbert von Karajan writing to the judges "of all the designs submitted, one seems to stand out above the others... founded on the principle that the performers should be in the middle... the deployment of the walls certainly makes good sense acoustically, but the most impressive of all is the complete concentration of the listener on the musical event".

Following the example of the Berliner Philharmonie, the first example in the New World was the Sala Nezahualcoyotl of 1976 in Mexico City. The style is now found globally. For the Philharmonie de Paris, the vineyard concept is extended with balconies rather than banked terraces.

Acoustics

Echoes occur when there is an audible gap between the direct sound and its reflection. The walls surrounding the stage on which the seats are banked help provide the early reflections of sound from the side that are generally considered favourable.  Installation of acoustic reflectors is another way of solving the problem.

Notable examples

References

External links
  1:10 acoustic model of the Philharmonie de Paris

Concert halls